Amos-5 was an Israeli commercial communications satellite, part of the AMOS series of satellites. It was developed and built for Spacecom by Information Satellite Systems Reshetnev (NPO PM), the largest Russian satellite producer, at a cost of US$157 million. The satellite was positioned at the 17° East longitude in the geostationary orbit. It was launched on 11 December 2011, 11:17:00 UTC from Baikonur Cosmodrome, Kazakhstan, atop a Proton-M / Briz-M launch vehicle. It provided coverage over the continent of Africa, as well as Europe and the Middle East.

Mission 
Following failure of power generator 1, generator 2 was activated in May 2012. Power generator 2 also developed faults in September 2012 and October 2013 and the satellite's initial lifespan of 15 years was expected to be shortened by 11 months. However all communications with the AMOS-5 satellite were lost on 21 November 2015. The satellite was visualized in its expected location, moving in an uncontrolled fashion, most likely due to power failure. Three weeks later, Spacecom announced that the satellite had failed completely. It is expected to continue to orbit at an altitude of 42,000 km for the foreseeable future. AMOS-5, which brings in annual revenue of some US$40 million, has an estimated value of between US$160 million and US$190 million. It is insured by an international syndicate for US$158 million. AMOS-5 was produced by the Russian company NPO PM, and cost US$157 million. It is the biggest of Spacecom's satellites it is the only satellite, other than AMOS-17 (which was developed by Boeing), not to be manufactured by IAI.

See also 

 2011 in spaceflight
 Amos (satellite)
 List of broadcast satellites
 Spacecom

References

External links 
 Amos by Spacecom

Satellite television
Satellites using the Ekspress bus
Communications satellites of Israel
Communications satellites in geostationary orbit
Spacecraft launched in 2011
2011 in Israel